Jonathan Santana Gehre (born 19 October 1981) is an Argentina-born Paraguayan former football midfielder and current model. He played for the Paraguay national team from 2007 to 2016. Santana was a key part of Paraguay's national team whilst under management of Tata Martino, featuring in three major competitions, the 2007 Copa América, the 2010 FIFA World Cup and the 2011 Copa América. Santana missed the final of the latter due to a red card in the semi-final against Venezuela. Santana's career ran from 1998 to 2020, playing in Argentina, Germany, Turkey and Paraguay. In 2021, Santana retired as a footballer and became a model.

Career
Santana's debut was in the 1998–99 season in Argentina's lower leagues, appearing in the squad with Japanese defender Shinji Muraki. He went on to play for a number of Argentine Primera clubs, including San Lorenzo and River Plate.

San Lorenzo
For the 2001–02 season, Santana joined San Lorenzo de Almagro for the 2002 Copa Libertadores and Copa Sudamericana tournaments, winning the latter and forming the squad with Cameroon midfielder William Tabi. In the 2004–05 season, Santana appeared for San Lorenzo in the Copa Libertadores in the squad with Ezequiel Lavezzi.

River Plate
For the 2005–06 season, Santana joined Argentine River Plate, reaching the quarter-final stages of the Copa Libertadores. Santana formed part of a high-profile team that included Juan Pablo Carrizo, German Lux, Diego Buonanotte, Marcelo Gallardo, Daniel Montenegro, Oscar Ahumada, Matias Abelairas, Luciano Figueroa, Gaston Fernandez, Gonzalo Higuaín, Colombian striker Radamel Falcao and future Paraguay national team colleague Julio Cesar Caceres.

Wolfsburg
In August 2006, he signed a five-year contract with German VfL Wolfsburg. Whilst Santana was at Wolfsburg during the 2006–07 season, he formed part of the team with Paraguayan Julio dos Santos. For his second season at the club, Santana was teammates with Edin Dzeko.

San Lorenzo (loan)
During a loan move to San Lorenzo in the 2008–09 Argentine Primera División season, he joined Paraguayan Aureliano Torres in the squad.

Santana returned to Wolfsburg for the 2009–10 season, where the team participated in the UEFA Champions League and the UEFA Europa League.

Kayserispor
Following the 2010 FIFA World Cup, Santana joined Turkish Super Lig team Kayserispor, partnering up with Marcelo Zalayeta, Franco Cangele, Ali Bilgin, Önder Turaci, Mehmet Boyraz and James Troisi in his first season at the club. Santa made 20 league appearances and scored four goals in his first season at the club, which saw Kayserispor finish in sixth position in the Super Lig table. In Santana's second season at the club, he amassed 15 league appearances before being loaned out to Primera División Paraguaya team Libertad for the 2012 season. Prior to his loan move, he was joined at Kayserispor by national team colleague Cristian Riveros.

Cerro Porteño
Santana debuted for Cerro Porteño in a 3–1 away victory against Club 12 de Octubre on 16 February 2014. Santana was substituted onto the field for Fidencio Oviedo in the 83rd minute of the match.

International career
In June 2007, Santana received Paraguayan citizenship (his mother is a Paraguayan citizen born in San Ignacio, Misiones Department and Argentina did not recognize dual citizenship). He played for Paraguay in the 2007 Copa América. He was also named in Paraguay's final 23-men squad for the 2010 FIFA World Cup. He entered the field during Paraguay's first game, a 1–1 draw with Italy, but suffered an injury during the match. However, as Paraguay's coach Gerardo Martino had already made the three available substitutions, Santana had to stay on the field and play injured for the remaining time.

Modeling career
Following his retirement from football in 2021, Santana and his wife modelled for a clothes store at Asunción shopping centre Paseo la Galeria.

Career statistics

Honours
San Lorenzo
 Copa Mercosur: 2001

VfL Wolfsburg
 Bundesliga: 2008–09

References

External links
 Jonathan Santana at playmakerstats.com
 
 
 
 
 

Citizens of Paraguay through descent
Paraguayan footballers
Paraguay international footballers
Argentine footballers
Paraguayan expatriate footballers
Club Almagro players
Argentine Primera División players
San Lorenzo de Almagro footballers
Nueva Chicago footballers
Club Atlético River Plate footballers
Club Atlético Independiente footballers
Expatriate footballers in Germany
Bundesliga players
VfL Wolfsburg players
Expatriate footballers in Turkey
Süper Lig players
Kayserispor footballers
Paraguayan Primera División players
Club Libertad footballers
Club Atlético Belgrano footballers
Cerro Porteño players
Club Atlético Sarmiento footballers
Association football midfielders
Argentine emigrants to Paraguay
Argentine sportspeople of Paraguayan descent
Footballers from Buenos Aires
1981 births
Living people
2010 FIFA World Cup players
2011 Copa América players
Argentine expatriate sportspeople in Germany
Paraguayan expatriate sportspeople in Germany